King Liar is a 2016 Indian Malayalam-language romantic comedy film with a story by Siddique, screenplay by Siddique-Lal and directed by Lal. The stars Dileep, Lal, Asha Sharath and Madonna Sebastian in the lead roles. It was produced by Ousepachan Valakuzhy under his production Ousepachan Movie House. The soundtrack and score were composed by Alex Paul and Deepak Dev. The film was released on 2 April 2016. The movie is about a manipulative liar, Sathyanarayan. The movie brought the writer-director duo Siddique-Lal together after 22 years.

Plot
Sathyanarayan (Dileep) is a manipulative liar, who lies to his love interest Anjali that he is the managing director of a big firm, while instead he makes duplicate certificates with his roommate and friend Antappan. Into their lives comes Anand Varma (Lal), a Dubai- based rich fashion tycoon, who is on the verge of divorce with his wife Devika Varma (Asha Sarath). Meanwhile, Sathyanarayan realizes that Anjali is his childhood friend.

Anand does not want to lose Devika, so he hires Sathyanarayan to persuade Devika to step back from the divorce. Sathyan and Antappan fly to Dubai to join the company which is now owned by Devika. The first time, Devika kicks Sathyan out of the company, but later had to let him join. Amazed by Sathyan's business tricks, Devika later promotes him as the Assistant Manager.

As Devika was planning to appoint someone representing Devika in the Asian Beauty Contest, Sathyan persuades Anand to pick Anjali as his model. Devika finally finds Natasha as her representative, but Sathyan persuades Natasha to reunite Anand and Devika. In the end, Anjali wins the competition after explaining the consequences of being divorced in the Intelligence round, and Anand and Devika reunite. Anjali, after the competition, visits Sathyan who says his real name is Sathyan to Anjali. Sathyan confesses that Anjali is his childhood friend, and they both reunite.

Cast

 Dileep as P. Sathyanarayanan / Naran
 Madonna Sebastian as Anjali, Sathyanarayan's childhood friend/love interest later wife
 Lal as Anand Varma, Owner of Varma Designs
 Asha Sarath as Devika Varma, wife of Anand Varma
 Joy Mathew as Pothuval Sir, father of Anjali
 Natasha Suri as Natasha
 Hareesh Perumanna as Pushpa Kumar/Pushpu
 Balu Varghese as Antappan
 Chali Pala as Kalidasan
 Moideen Koya as Prasad
 Balachandran Chullikkad as Paraparambil Narayanan Nair
 Shivaji Guruvayoor as Gopi Sir
 Ansar Kalabhavan as Omega Consultancy Manager
 Punnapara Prashanth as Shanthan, Village Drunkard
 K.T.S. Padannayil as Aarsha Bharatha Samskaram Editor (Cameo)
 Bipin Chandran as Announcer
 Samarth Ambujakshan as Magician John
 Aileena Catherine Amon as Model
 Binu Adimali as Sudheesh, Police Officer
 Nebish Benson as Young Sathyan
 Vijay Menon as Thomas Chennikkadan
Amith Chakalakkal as Host
Rithu Manthra as Model

Music
"Annadyamaay"
"Dinamithu Kaathirunnere (Anjali)", singer: Arjun Muralidharan
"Hello Hello Check Hello", singer: Vipin Lal
"Perum Nunappuzha", singer: Manjari, Vijay Yesudas
"Title Song"

Production
Principal photography commenced at Kochi on 21 October 2015. The film was shot in Kuttanad,  Dubai and Kochi.

Release
King Liar released on 2 April 2016 in 127 screens in Kerala.

Reception

Box office
The film collected  on its opening day and 5.32 crore within its first four days at the Kerala box office. Making a share of 2.35 crore in 4 days. It collected 96 lakh in the fifth day, making it 6.28 crore and 8.56 crore gross collection in 8 days, thus making a share amount of 4.05 crore. The film grossed 12.73 crore after 15 days and continued in 80 screens in its third week. The film collected  in a month from the Kerala box office. The film collected  within 41 days from the Kerala box office alone. The film collected  from Kerala box office in 58 days.

References

External links
 

2016 films
2016 comedy films
2010s Malayalam-language films
Indian comedy films
Films shot in Alappuzha
Films shot in Kochi
Films shot in Dubai
Films scored by Alex Paul
Films scored by Suresh Peters
Films scored by Deepak Dev
Films directed by Lal